Tuoba sydneyensis is a species of centipede in the Geophilidae family. It was first described in 1891 by British zoologist Reginald Innes Pocock.

Description
This species is orange yellow throughout, can reach up to 32 mm in length, and ranges from 39 to 55 pairs of legs.

Distribution
The species occurs in Western Australia and New South Wales as well as Seychelles, New Guinea, New Caledonia, the Solomon Islands and the Hawaiian Islands. The type locality is Double Bay, Port Jackson, in Sydney.

Behaviour
The centipedes are solitary terrestrial predators that inhabit plant litter, soil and rotting wood.

References

 

 
sydneyensis
Centipedes of Australia
Arthropods of New Guinea
Fauna of New South Wales
Fauna of Western Australia
Fauna of New Caledonia
Fauna of the Solomon Islands
Fauna of Hawaii
Animals described in 1891
Taxa named by R. I. Pocock